The 2018–19 Virginia Tech Hokies women's basketball team represented Virginia Polytechnic Institute and State University during the 2018–19 NCAA Division I women's basketball season. The Hokies, led by third year head coach Kenny Brooks, played their home games at Cassell Coliseum as members of the Atlantic Coast Conference. They finished the season 22–12, 6–10 in ACC play to finish in a tie for tenth place. They advanced to the second round of the ACC women's tournament where they lost to Clemson. They received an automatic bid to the Women's National Invitation Tournament where they defeated Furman and VCU in the first and second rounds before losing to James Madison in the third round.

Previous season
They finished the season 23–14, 6–10 in ACC play to finish in a tie for ninth place. They advanced to the quarterfinals of the ACC women's tournament where they lost to Louisville. They received an automatic bid to the Women's National Invitation Tournament where they defeated Navy, George Mason and Fordham in the first, second and third rounds respectively, Alabama in the quarterfinals, West Virginia in the semifinals to advanced to the championship game where they lost to Indiana.

Off-season

Recruiting Class

Source:

Roster

Shaniya Jones transferred after appearing in 5 games for the Hokies.

Schedule

Source:

|-
!colspan=9 style=| Non-conference regular season

|-
!colspan=9 style=| ACC regular season

|-
!colspan=9 style=| ACC Women's Tournament

|-
!colspan=9 style=| WNIT

Player statistics

Rankings
2018–19 NCAA Division I women's basketball rankings

See also
 2018–19 Virginia Tech Hokies men's basketball team

References

Virginia Tech
Virginia Tech
Virginia Tech
Virginia Tech Hokies women's basketball seasons
Virginia Tech